Beč may refer to:

 Beč, Slovenia, a settlement near Cerknica, Slovenia
 Beč, Croatia, a village near Bosiljevo, Croatia
 Vienna, the capital of Austria, in Serbo-Croatian (Croatian, Bosnian, Serbian, Montenegrin)

See also
 Bec (disambiguation)